Ozark County is a county located in the southern portion of the U.S. state of Missouri. As of the 2020 census, the population was 8,553. The largest city and county seat is Gainesville. The county was organized as Ozark County, named after the Ozark Mountains, on January 29, 1841. It was renamed Decatur County, after Commodore Stephen Decatur, from 1843 to 1845, after which the name Ozark County was restored.

Geography
Arkansas is located to the south of Ozark County.

Adjacent counties
Douglas County (north)
Howell County (east)
Fulton County, Arkansas (southeast)
Baxter County, Arkansas (south)
Marion County, Arkansas (southwest)
Taney County (west)

Major highways
 U.S. Route 160
 Route 5
 Route 95
 Route 142
 Route 181

National protected area
Mark Twain National Forest (part)

Demographics

As of the census of 2000, there were 9,542 people, 3,950 households, and 2,855 families residing in the county. The population density was 13 people per square mile (5/km2). There were 5,114 housing units at an average density of 7 per square mile (3/km2). The racial makeup of the county was 97.57% White, 0.15% Black or African American, 0.65% Native American, 0.08% Asian, 0.19% from other races, and 1.36% from two or more races. Approximately 0.94% of the population were Hispanic or Latino of any race. Among the major first ancestries reported in Ozark County were 28.6% American, 15.9% German, 12.1% English, and 11.4% Irish.

There were 3,950 households, out of which 26.20% had children under the age of 18 living with them, 62.20% were married couples living together, 6.90% had a female householder with no husband present, and 27.70% were non-families. 24.40% of all households were made up of individuals, and 12.20% had someone living alone who was 65 years of age or older. The average household size was 2.40 and the average family size was 2.81.

In the county, the population was spread out, with 22.10% under the age of 18, 6.90% from 18 to 24, 22.80% from 25 to 44, 28.70% from 45 to 64, and 19.50% who were 65 years of age or older. The median age was 44 years. For every 100 females there were 98.10 males. For every 100 females age 18 and over, there were 96.30 males.

The median income for a household in the county was $31,508, and the median income for a family was $36,622. Males had a median income of $21,685 versus $17,312 for females. The per capita income for the county was $17,302. About 16.10% of families and 21.60% of the population were below the poverty line, including 30.80% of those under age 18 and 17.20% of those age 65 or over.

Religion
According to the Association of Religion Data Archives County Membership Report (2000), Ozark County is a part of the Bible Belt with evangelical Protestantism being the majority religion. The most predominant denominations among residents in Ozark County who adhere to a religion are Southern Baptists (25.79%), Churches of Christ (24.83%), and Pentecostals (17.07%).

2020 Census

Education
Of adults 25 years of age and older in Ozark County, 73.0% possesses a high school diploma or higher while 8.3% holds a bachelor's degree or higher as their highest educational attainment.

Public schools
Thornfield R-I School District - Thornfield - (K-08)
Lutie R-VI School District - Theodosia
Lutie Elementary School (K-06)
Lutie High School (07-12)
Gainesville R-V School District - Gainesville
Gainesville Elementary School (K-06)
Gainesville High School (07-12)
Dora R-III School District - Dora
Dora Elementary School (K-06)
Dora High School (07-12)
Bakersfield R-IV School District - Bakersfield
Bakersfield Elementary School (PK-05)
Bakersfield High School (06-12)

Public libraries
Gainesville Library

Politics

Local
The Republican Party predominantly controls politics at the local level in Ozark County. Republicans hold all but one of the elected positions in the county.

State
All of Ozark County is a part of Missouri's 155th District in the Missouri House of Representatives and is represented by Travis Smith (R-Dora). 

All of Ozark County is a part of Missouri's 33rd District in the Missouri Senate and is currently represented by Carla Eslinger (R-Wasola).

Federal

Ozark County is included in Missouri's 8th Congressional District and is currently represented by Jason T. Smith (R-Salem) in the U.S. House of Representatives. Smith won a special election on Tuesday, June 4, 2013, to finish out the remaining term of U.S. Representative Jo Ann Emerson (R-Cape Girardeau). Emerson announced her resignation a month after being reelected with over 70 percent of the vote in the district. She resigned to become CEO of the National Rural Electric Cooperative.

Political culture

Like most counties situated in Southwest Missouri, Ozark County is a Republican stronghold in presidential elections. George W. Bush carried Ozark County in 2000 and 2004 by convincing two-to-one margins. Like many other rural counties throughout Missouri, Ozark County favored John McCain over Barack Obama in 2008. No Democratic presidential nominee has won Ozark County in over 150 years.

Like most rural areas throughout the Bible Belt in Southwest Missouri, voters in Ozark County traditionally adhere to socially and culturally conservative principles which tend to influence their Republican leanings. In 2004, Missourians voted on a constitutional amendment to define marriage as the union between a man and a woman—it overwhelmingly passed Ozark County with 82.18 percent of the vote. The initiative passed the state with 71 percent of support from voters as Missouri became the first state to ban same-sex marriage. In 2006, Missourians voted on a constitutional amendment to fund and legalize embryonic stem cell research in the state—it narrowly failed in Ozark County with 51.07 percent voting against the measure. The initiative narrowly passed the state with 51 percent of support from voters as Missouri became one of the first states in the nation to approve embryonic stem cell research. Despite Ozark County's longstanding tradition of supporting socially conservative platforms, voters in the county have a penchant for advancing populist causes like increasing the minimum wage. In 2006, Missourians voted on a proposition (Proposition B) to increase the minimum wage in the state to $6.50 an hour—it passed Ozark County with 76.94 percent of the vote. The proposition strongly passed every single county in Missouri with 78.99 percent voting in favor as the minimum wage was increased to $6.50 an hour in the state. During the same election, voters in five other states also strongly approved increases in the minimum wage.

Missouri presidential preference primary (2008)

In the 2008 presidential primary, voters in Ozark County from both political parties supported candidates who finished in second place in the state at large and nationally. Former Governor Mike Huckabee (R-Arkansas) received more votes, a total of 766, than any candidate from either party in Ozark County during the 2008 presidential primary.

Communities

City
Gainesville (county seat)

Villages
Bakersfield
Theodosia

Census-designated places
Pontiac
Sundown
Wasola

Unincorporated communities

Almartha
Brixey
Dora
Dugginsville
Elijah
Foil
Hammond
Hardenville
Howards Ridge
Isabella
Longrun
Lutie
Mammoth
Noble
Nottinghill
Ocie
Rockbridge
Romance
Souder
Sycamore
Tecumseh
Thornfield
Trail
Udall
Willhoit
Zanoni

See also
National Register of Historic Places listings in Ozark County, Missouri

References

External links
 Digitized 1930 Plat Book of Ozark County  from University of Missouri Division of Special Collections, Archives, and Rare Books

 
1841 establishments in Missouri
Populated places established in 1841